The two-man bobsleigh results at the 1956 Winter Olympics in Cortina d'Ampezzo. The competition was held on Friday and Saturday, 27 and 28 January 1956.

Medallists

Results

References

External links
1956 bobsleigh two-man results

Bobsleigh at the 1956 Winter Olympics